Liz Watts is an Australian film producer best known for Animal Kingdom (2010).

In 1997, with Vincent Sheehan and Anita Sheehan, and she formed Porchlight Films. around 2008. The company ceased operations on 20 June 2020.

In 2021 she struck an overall deal with Matchbox Pictures.

Selected filmography
Martha's New Coat (2003)
Jewboy (2005)
Little Fish (2005)
The Home Song Stories (2007)
Animal Kingdom (2010)
Laid (2011–12) (TV series)
Lore (2012)
Dead Europe (2012)
The Rover (2014)
Jasper Jones (2017)
Mary Magdalene (2018)
 True History of the Kelly Gang (2019)

References

External links

1965 births
Living people
Australian film producers